St. Michael's Anglican Church (formerly St. Michael's Episcopal Church) is a historic church and the oldest surviving religious structure in Charleston, South Carolina. It is located at Broad and Meeting streets on one of the Four Corners of Law, and represents ecclesiastical law. It was built in the 1750s by order of the South Carolina Assembly. It is listed on the National Register of Historic Places and is a National Historic Landmark.

History

St. Michael's Church was built between 1751 and 1761 at the corner of Broad and Meeting streets on the site of the original wooden church built in 1681 by St. Philip's Church, It had been damaged in a hurricane in 1710 and a new St. Philip's Church was built several blocks away on Church Street. In 1727, what was left of the old wooden church was demolished. During his 1791 visit to the city, President George Washington worshipped in pew no. 43 of the church. Robert E. Lee also worshipped here.

It is not known who designed St. Michael's, but it shows the influence of  St Martin-in-the-Fields, London, designed in the 1720s by James Gibbs. Samuel Cardy was the builder. The walls are of brick that was stuccoed over and painted white. The two-story portico facing Broad Street was the first of its size in colonial America and features Tuscan columns.

An organ by John Snetzler was fitted in 1768 but only the  case remains; new organ 1994 by Kenneth Jones of Bray, Ireland.

In the north wall is a stained glass window that was given to the church in 1898 as a memorial to Mrs. E.A. Simons. The design of the window is a copy of "Easter Morning" using between 1800 and 2000 pieces in the six by ten foot window. It was created by Louis Lederlie for Tiffany Studios. Louis Tiffany spent two months on the decorative panels and dome of the chancel in 1905.

Another stained glass window is located in the chancel and depicts St. Michael conquering Satan; it is based on a work in the Louvre by Raphael. The window was made in New York and installed in 1893. The location had originally been a window, but the opening was enclosed in 1788 to prevent the spread of fires from adjacent buildings. In 1865, the wall was damaged by shelling during the Civil War, and the location of the window became apparent.

It was declared a National Historic Landmark in 1961, and it was included in the first promulgation of the National Register in 1966.

St. Michael's Churchyard, adjacent to the church, is the resting place of some famous historical figures, including two signers of the U.S. Constitution.

Religious affiliation
St. Michael's was originally affiliated with the Church of England. Following the American Revolution the church came under the jurisdiction of what is now the Episcopal Church of the United States. Currently it is a parish church of the Anglican Diocese of South Carolina. In 2012 long simmering disagreements over doctrine and church discipline caused the Episcopal Diocese of SC to disaffiliate from the Episcopal Church, over time becoming known as the Anglican diocese of South Carolina. In June 2017 the diocese, and by extension St. Michael's, were received into the Anglican Church in North America. The parish continues to worship according to Anglican rites and traditions.

Clock and bells
The church houses a clock and change ringing bells dating from colonial times. The tower clock, which strikes the hours and quarters, was made by Aynsworth Thwaites Thwaites & Reed.

The tower bells are one of four sets (Grace Church Cathedral – Episcopal, The Cathedral Church of Saint Luke and Saint Paul, and Stella Maris Catholic church) in the Charleston area. The bells were cast in 1764 by Lester and Pack of London and recast in 1866 (in London again). One bell was returned to London in 1870 to be recast at the expense of Charleston.

Gallery

See also

National Register of Historic Places listings in Charleston, South Carolina
List of National Historic Landmarks in South Carolina
St. Michael's Churchyard, Charleston

References

Further reading

External links

Saint Michael's  Episcopal Church, Charleston County (80 Meeting St., Charleston), including four photos, at South Carolina Department of Archives and History

site history
National Historic Landmarks Program listing for Saint Michael's  Episcopal Church
National Register listings for Charleston County
Historic Charleston's Religious and Community Buildings, a National Park Service Discover Our Shared Heritage Travel Itinerary

National Historic Landmarks in South Carolina
Churches on the National Register of Historic Places in South Carolina
Historic American Buildings Survey in South Carolina
Churches in Charleston, South Carolina
National Register of Historic Places in Charleston, South Carolina
18th-century Episcopal church buildings
Anglican churches in South Carolina
Colonial South Carolina
English-American culture in South Carolina
Historic district contributing properties in South Carolina
Anglican Church in North America church buildings in the United States
Former Episcopal church buildings in South Carolina
Anglican realignment congregations